Applecross is a peninsula north-west of Kyle of Lochalsh in the council area of Highland, Scotland. The name Applecross is at least 1,300 years old and is not used locally to refer to the 19th century village (which is correctly called 'Shore Street', or simply 'The Street') with the Applecross Inn, lying on the Applecross Bay, facing the Inner Sound, on the opposite side of which lies the Inner Hebridean island of Raasay. The monastery of Applecross was established by St Maelrubha, in the 7th century. A sculptured stone is the only remaining relic of Maelrubha, who built a chapel there. The Applecross peninsula ('The Sanctuary') is a peninsula in Wester Ross, Highland, on the north west coast of Scotland.

Geography
This row of houses which is often referred to as 'Applecross', and is marked as Applecross on some maps, is actually called 'Shore Street' and is referred to locally just as 'The Street'. The name Applecross applies to all the settlements around the peninsula, including Toscaig, Culduie, Camusterrach, Sand, and many others. Applecross is also the name of the local estate and the civil parish, which includes Shieldaig and Torridon, and has a population of 544. The small River Applecross flows into the bay at Applecross.

In 1975 the settlement was connected via a winding coastal road which travels around the edge of the peninsula to Shieldaig and Torridon. The road skirts the shore of the Inner Sound and Loch Torridon.

Early history

Applecross's name is an anglicisation of the Pictish name Aporcrosan, 'confluence of the [river] Crossan' ( in modern Gaelic). The name is derived from the Pictish aber- and Scottish Gaelic cros. Historically, the settlement is linked with St Máelrubai (Old Irish form) or Máel Ruba, who came to Scotland in 671 from the major Irish monastery of Bangor, County Down. He founded Aporcrosan in 672 in what was then Pictish territory, and was the monastery's first abbot, dying on 21 April 722 in his eightieth year. The deaths of several of his successors as abbot are recorded in the Irish Annals into the early ninth century. The early monastery was located around the site of the later parish church (present building erected 1817). A large, unfinished cross-slab standing in the churchyard and three extremely finely carved fragments of another (or more than one?) preserved within the church are evidence of the early monastery. The surrounding district is known as  'the sanctuary' in Gaelic. Its boundaries were once marked by crosses. The stub of one, destroyed in 1870, survives among farm buildings at Camusterrach.

There are many churches dedicated to Máel Ruba on Skye and throughout northern Scotland, the saint's name sometimes taking distorted forms (e.g. 'Rufus' at Keith in Banffshire). Loch Maree and its holy island of Eilean Ma-Ruibhe (site of an early church and holy well) are both named after the saint.

The area around Applecross is believed to be one of the earliest settled parts of Scotland. The coastal settlement of Sand, just to the north of Applecross, is the location of a major archaeological site.

Applecross estate

In the second half of the 16th century, the lands of Applecross came into the possession of Alexander Mackenzie (died 1650), an illegitimate son of Colin Cam Mackenzie of Kintail. With a brief interruption between 1715 and 1724 (a period of forfeiture caused by Applecross's part in the 1715 Uprising), the estate remained in the ownership of Mackenzie's heirs until the mid-19th century, when it was sold to the Duke of Leeds.

In the early 1860s, the estate was sold to Lord Middleton. Following the death of the 10th Baron Middleton in 1924, the estate was sold to the Wills family.

The Estate is now owned by the Applecross Trust, a registered Scottish charity with the declared aim of preserving "the special character of the Applecross peninsula in a responsible and progressive manner whilst acknowledging its wilderness heritage and its importance as an area of outstanding natural beauty". The Applecross Trust is controlled by seven people and chaired by Richard Wills, of Andover, Hampshire. None of the members lives in Applecross.

Wildlife 
Many native Scottish animals can be found in Applecross, including mammals such as red deer, pine martens, otters, water voles, blue hare, foxes, a rare wildcat, and pipistrelle and Daubenton's bats as well as birds such as tawny and barn owls, white tailed and golden eagles, great skua, arctic tern, great spotted woodpeckers, song thrush, bullfinches, golden plover, skylark, merlin, greenshank, dunlin, red and, occasionally, the rarer black grouse, dotterel, and rock ptarmigan. In terms of marine life there are common seals near the shore, as well as basking sharks, minke whales, porpoises, and bottlenose dolphins. Adders can also be found here.

Economy
In July 2010, at a cost of £40,000, the UK's first unmanned petrol station was opened. It uses a credit card reader to enable customers to serve themselves. The business was taken over by Applecross Community Company in 2008 in response to its possible closure. The only alternative involves a  round trip to Lochcarron.

Tourism
Recently Applecross has experienced an increase in tourism for those looking for a place to hike, kayak, fish, and cycle. The North Coast 500 cycling route crosses the Bealach na Bà pass and goes through Applecross along the coastal road.

Media and the arts
Applecross appeared as Laxdale in the 1953 film Laxdale Hall, in which the community protests against the poor condition of the access road by withholding their Road Tax.

On television, Applecross appeared as Carnochie in the "Upstairs Downstairs" episode "Will Ye No Come Back Again?" (1975). It later featured in Monty Halls' Great Escape (2009) and an edition of Channel 4's Time Team (series 13, episode 13) when a broch (hollow-walled structure) was excavated.

It is mentioned in the writings of Margaret Leigh; particularly in 'Driftwood and Tangle'. It is also the setting for Graeme Macrae Burnet's 2015 novel His Bloody Project which was nominated for the Man Booker Prize in 2016. It also was the main setting of the "Enchanted Emporium" series by Pierdomenico Baccalario.

Climate

See also 
 Aber and Inver as place-name elements

References

External links
Applecross Landscape Partnership
Applecross Historical Society
Applecross Walks
The Applecross Trust

Populated places in Ross and Cromarty
Peninsulas of Scotland
Clan Mackenzie
Former Christian monasteries in Scotland
Parishes in Ross and Cromarty